The Voltoya is a river in Spain. It is a tributary river of Eresma River which is, in turn a tributary of the Adaja River that emerges from  Douro River. Its starts in the mountains of Guadarrama and Malagón. The water from Dehesa de la Cepeda , enclave of the city of Madrid and the Azálvaro Field also flow into the Voltoya . It runs through the Castilian-Leonese provinces of Ávila and Segovia . Its mouth is in Coca (Segovia). The Serones Reservoir, which supplies drinking water to the city of Ávila is located on the Voltoya. Tributaries of the Voltoya on the left are the Tuerto, Ciervos or de Mediana rivers, which in turn receive the waters of the Cortos and the Saornil stream. It receives the waters of the Cardeña river and the Magdalena stream. The Torrelara reservoir , near Peromingo is located on these . It the N-110 and the AP-51 cross the river over concrete bridges. In the past a stone bridge of a single arch with granite keystones of granite was used as a crossing . Further downstream it the  A-6 and the N-VI near Coto de Puenteviejo . Here it leaves the province of Ávila and enters that of Segovia , to pass through Juarros de Voltoya and the Nava de la Asunción.

See also
 List of rivers of Spain

References

Rivers of Spain